"The Wheel" is a song by the English musician PJ Harvey. It is the tenth track and lead single from her ninth studio album, The Hope Six Demolition Project, and was released digitally on 22 January 2016 and physically on 4 March 2016 on Island Records.

The song was premiered on Steve Lamacq's show on BBC Radio 6 Music on 21 January 2016, the day before its release. Pitchfork would later list "The Wheel" on their ranking of the 100 best songs of 2016 at number 80.

Background of the song and making of the music video
The music video for "The Wheel" was released on 1 February 2016 and was directed by Séamus Murphy. In a statement to Noisey, Harvey said:

In his statement to Noisey, Murphy, a famous conflict zone photographer, described the inspiration for the song, video, and the project as a whole:

Track listing

References

External links
 

2016 singles
2016 songs
Garage punk songs
Island Records singles
PJ Harvey songs
Songs written by PJ Harvey
Vagrant Records singles
Music videos shot in Kosovo